Zelyony Klin is a rural locality (a khutor) in Volokonovsky District, Belgorod Oblast, Russia. The population was 62 as of 2010. There are 2 streets.

Geography 
Zelyony Klin is located 30 km west of Volokonovka (the district's administrative centre) by road. Volchya Alexandrovka is the nearest rural locality.

References 

Rural localities in Volokonovsky District